Valery Ivanovich Boldin (1935 — 2006) was a Soviet party figure. He was a Member of the Central Committee of the Communist Party of the Soviet Union (1988 — 1991) and Deputy of the Supreme Soviet of the 11th convocation, People's Deputy of the USSR.

Candidate of Economic Sciences (1969).

Biography 
Graduated from the Faculty of Economics of Russian State Agrarian University - Moscow Timiryazev Agricultural Academy (1956-1961).

Member of the CPSU since 1960. Since 1961 he worked in the apparatus of the Central Committee of the CPSU. In 1969 he graduated from the Academy of Social Sciences under the CPSU Central Committee.

In 1981-1987, Assistant Secretary, General Secretary of the CPSU Central Committee Mikhail Gorbachev. 

Since March 23, 1990 a member of the Presidential Council of the USSR.

On April 17, 1990 on August 22, 1991 Chief of Staff of the President of the Soviet Union.

Actively participated in the events of August 1991 on the side of the State Committee on the State of Emergency.

August 18, 1991 as part of a group of 4 people (Baklanov, Boldin, Varennikov and Shenin) flew to Gorbachev in Foros. At 6 pm their group flew back to Moscow.

On August 22, 1991, he was released from office [3] and arrested in the case of the State Emergency Committee; he was detained in the Matrosskaya Tishina detention center; in December 1991 he was released on recognizance not to leave. On May 6, 1994 the criminal case was terminated on the basis of the decree of the State Duma On the Announcement of Political and Economic Amnesty.

He died in 2006. He was buried at the Troyekurovskoye Cemetery.

References

External links 
 Над пропастью во лжи : Воспоминания Валерия Болдина, бывшего помощника Генерального секретаря ЦК КПСС
  Памяти В. И. Болдина

1935 births
2006 deaths
Central Committee of the Communist Party of the Soviet Union members
Eleventh convocation members of the Supreme Soviet of the Soviet Union
Recipients of the Order of Friendship of Peoples
Recipients of the Order of the Red Banner of Labour
Russian communists
Soviet politicians
People of the 1991 Soviet coup d'état attempt
Burials in Troyekurovskoye Cemetery